Craig Aukerman (born November 22, 1976) is an American football coach and former defensive back and wide receiver who is currently the special teams coordinator for the Tennessee Titans.

Playing career 
Aukerman played football collegiately at the  University of Findlay. There he played defensive back and wide receiver from 1995 to 1998.

Coaching career

College coaching 
Aukerman began his coaching career at his alma mater the University of Findlay where he served as a wide receivers coach. For the next two years he was with the Miami RedHawks working as a graduate assistant. He then went on to the Hilltoppers only to return to Miami after two years. After four more seasons with Miami, in 2009 Aukerman served as the linebackers  at Kent State.

NFL coaching 
Aukerman broke into the NFL as a defensive assistant for the 2010 Denver Broncos only to leave after a year and join the Jacksonville Jaguars in the same capacity. In 2012, he was transitioned to become an assistant special teams coach instead of defense with the Jaguars. In 2013 Aukerman went out west to San Diego and joined the Chargers. His first three years with the organization he worked as an assistant special teams coach but in 2016 he was given the coordinator role. In 2017, he joined the Titans  as an assistant special teams coach but was given the coordinator title by Mike Vrabel the following year.

Personal life 
Craig and his wife Summer both attended rural high schools in Ohio. They met while Craig was working as a graduate assistant at the University of Miami (Ohio), and Summer was a volleyball player studying special education. The couple has two children, Cayden and Bryce.

References

Living people
American football wide receivers
American football defensive backs
Coaches of American football from Ohio
Western Kentucky Hilltoppers football coaches
Miami RedHawks football coaches
Kent State Golden Flashes football coaches
Jacksonville Jaguars coaches
Denver Broncos coaches
Players of American football from Ohio
San Diego Chargers coaches
Tennessee Titans coaches
Year of birth missing (living people)